Saryupareen Brahmins, also known as Sarvarya Brahmins, Sarjupar Brahmins or Saryupariya Brahmins, are North Indian Brahmins residing on the eastern plain of the Sarayu. Saryupareen families, were involved solely in the research and analysis of Vedas and other religious texts, performing yajnas and other religious practices. These families did not perform "pujas" for benefactors and take "dakshinas" (donations) for those prayers. Hence, they were considered to be solely devoted to the quest of learning about the Vedas and spreading knowledge rather than benefiting in any way through benefactors.

The Saryupareen generally dwell in the states of Uttar Pradesh, Bihar and Madhya Pradesh with a significant amount of them concentrated in the eastern region of Uttar Pradesh known as Purvanchal.  There are also minority Saryupareen communities in Mauritius, where Bhojpuri is a commonly spoken language and the Caribbean. During the colonial rule in Purvanchal and parts of Madhya Pradesh and Bihar most of the Saryuparin Brahmins were landlords and Administrative officers.  The priestly duties and agriculture is their primary occupation However they are not engaged in Agriculture directly they get it done through the workers who are paid in cash and crops. They are called the Genius Clan because of their contributions in literature, history and other subjects.

Classification

Main groups 

Saryupareen Brahmins are divided into three categories- Paitiha, also known as Pankti Paavan (meaning those who sat in a row); Jatiha, (also known as Jaati kula or 13 , and Tutiha (also known as Truti kula).

Other gotras 
The Krishanatraya, Ghritakausika, and Margeya gotras are called the mishrit (combined) gotra.

Up to 261 gotras are mentioned in some sources.

See also
 Chaturvedi
 Rai (Indian)
 Upadhyay
 Tripathi
 Parashar
 Tiwari
 Shukla
 Pandey
 Dubey (Gautam Gotra)
 Mishra

References

Brahmin communities of Uttar Pradesh
Social groups of Bihar